The Old English Hexateuch is the collaborative project of the late Anglo-Saxon period that translated the six books of the Hexateuch into Old English, presumably under the editorship of Ælfric of Eynsham. It is the first English vernacular translation of the first six books of the Old Testament, i.e. the five books of the Torah (Genesis, Exodus, Leviticus, Numbers and Deuteronomy) and Joshua.  It was probably made for use by lay people. 

The translation is known in seven manuscripts, most of which are fragmentary. The best-known of those is a richly illuminated manuscript in the British Library, Cotton MS Claudius B.iv. Another copy of the text, without lavish illustrations but including a translation of the Book of Judges (hence also called the Old English Heptateuch), is found in Oxford, Bodleian Library, Laud Misc. 509.

The whole manuscript is available online at the British Library website.

Cotton Claudius B.iv, British Library

Claudius B.iv. was probably compiled in the second quarter of the 11th century at St Augustine's Abbey, Canterbury. It incorporates translations and a preface by Ælfric of Eynsham, while the remaining parts of the translation were carried out by anonymous authors. Peter Clemoes suggests that Byrhtferth of Ramsey was responsible for the compilation as well as for parts of the translation.  With 156 folios, it is largely complete, but does not include all the biblical text of the books.  Commentary and other material in Latin and Old English was added in the 12th century, often using blank areas in incomplete miniatures.

One or, more likely, several artists accompanied the narrative with 394 drawings in inks of various colours, most brightly coloured with washes, containing about 550 scenes.  Many of these are unfinished, at varying stages of completion. The settings do not attempt to represent Old Testament life as anything different from that of contemporary Anglo-Saxons, and so give valuable depictions of many aspects of the Anglo-Saxon world.  The extensive illustrations suggest that it was designed mainly for lay use.  It is the earliest illustrated manuscript of a large part of the bible in any vernacular language.  

There are twelve full-page miniatures spread through the texts, and the other miniatures range from nearly full-page to about a quarter of a page. Many pages have two or even three illustrations, and the majority of pages have a miniature, some of which combine two scenes in bordered compartments. The degree of completion with washes tends to diminish as the book goes on. The colouring has some eccentricities; in particular many figures have blue hair, and the many tents are shown with boldly coloured stripes. Opportunities offered by the text to show groups of animals are usually taken, and the Hand of God frequently appears. It was in the Cotton Library by 1621.

See also
Wessex Gospels

Notes

References
BL: British Library, Cotton MS Claudius B IV
Breay, Clare and Story, Joanna (eds), Anglo-Saxon Kingdoms: Art, Word, War, 2018, British Library (exhibition catalogue),  
Dodwell, C. R., The Pictorial arts of the West, 800-1200, 1993, Yale UP,

Further reading

Editions
Dodwell, C. R. & Clemoes, Peter (eds.). The Old English Illustrated Hexateuch. Early English Manuscripts in Facsimile; 18. Copenhagen: Rosenkilde & Bagger, 1974. Facsimile edition of British Library, Cotton MS Claudius B.iv.
Crawford, Samuel J. (ed.). The Old English Version of the Heptateuch, Ælfric's Treatise on the Old and New Testament and His Preface to Genesis. Early English Text Society; 160. London: Oxford University Press, 1969. Critical edition of the text.
Marsden, Richard (ed.). The Old English Heptateuch and Ælfric's "Libellus de veteri testamento et novo". Early English Text Society; 330. Oxford: Oxford U. P., 2008.

Secondary literature
Barnhouse, Rebecca, and Benjamin C. Withers (eds.). The Old English Hexateuch: aspects and approaches. Kalamazoo: Medieval Institute, 2000.
Mellinkoff, Ruth. "Serpent Imagery in the Illustrated Old English Hexateuch." Brown, P. R., et al. (eds.) Modes of Interpretation in Old English Literature: essays in honour of Stanley B. Greenfield / edited by Phyllis Rugg Brown. Toronto: University of Toronto Press, 1986.
Withers, Benjamin C. The Illustrated Old English Hexateuch, Cotton Claudius B.iv.: the frontier of seeing and reading in Anglo-Saxon England. Studies in Book and Print Culture. London: British Library, 2007. .
Withers, Benjamin C. "A 'secret and feverish genesis': the Prefaces of the Old English Hexateuch." The Art Bulletin; 81:1 (1999): 53-71.

External links

11th-century illuminated manuscripts
Later Anglo-Saxon illuminated manuscripts
Bible translations into English
Illuminated biblical manuscripts
Old English literature
Cotton Library